The Jamanxim Dam is a proposed hydroelectric dam on the Jamanxim River in the state of Pará, Brazil.

Location

The Jamanxim Dam is proposed to be built on the Jamanxim River in the state of Pará, in the Tapajós river basin.
It would be built in the municipality of Itaituba.
The dam would flood  of the Jamanxim National Park.
It would affect the South Amazon Ecotones Ecological Corridor.

The hydroelectric power plant will be part of the proposed  Tapajós hydroelectric complex on the Tapajós and Jamanxim rivers.
Others are the São Luiz do Tapajós (6,133 MW), Jatobá (2,338 MW), Cachoeira do Cai (802 MW) and Cachoeira dos Patos (528 MW), all under study, as well as the Chacorão (3,336 MW) and Jardim do Ouro (227 MW).

Technical

Estimated cost would e US$984 million.
The project would be built by Eletrobras, Eletronorte, Construções e Comércio Camargo Côrrea, EDF Consultoria em Projetos de Geração de Energia, Endesa Brasil, EPP Energia Elétrica, Promoção e Participações, Neoenergia Investimentos and Odebrecht.

Planning process

On 20 January 2016 it was reported that the deadline for the feasibility study for the Jatobá plant had been extended to December 2016, and the deadline for the Jamanxim plant feasibility study was now 31 December 2017.

A "platform" approach is proposed for construction to minimise environmental impact.
There would be no access roads, and workers would be taken to the site by helicopter.
After construction is complete the site would be regenerated.

Notes

Sources

Hydroelectric power stations in Brazil
Dams in Pará
Jamanaxim Dam
Proposed renewable energy power stations in Brazil